Epinotia tetraquetrana, the square-barred bell, is a moth of the family Tortricidae. It is found from most of Europe east to the Near East and the eastern part of the Palearctic realm.

The wingspan is 12–16 mm. The forewings are fuscous,darker-strigulated, often whitish-mixed. The costa is strigulated with blackish and posteriorly with white.The edge of the basal patch is suffused with ferruginous-brown, partly blackish-marked and obtusely angulated Beyond this there issometimes an obscure whitish subquadrate dorsal spot . The central fascia is darker, often ferruginous-suffused ; costal half beyond this sometimes ferruginous suffused, with some black scales. The ocellus is obscurely edged with leaden-metallic, usually preceded by a small black subdorsal spot. The termen is sinuate . There is a white subapical dash in cilia.The hindwings are grey.The larva is pale yellowish-green ; head and plate of 2 dark or light brown.

Adults are on wing from April to May.

The young larvae bore into the stem of Betula and Alnus species. Later, they feed within a folded leaf.

Gallery

References

Moths described in 1811
Eucosmini
Moths of Europe
Moths of Asia